María Eva Ferreira García (born 25 January 1963 in Barakaldo, Biscay) is the Rector of the University of the Basque Country (UPV/EHU). She graduated from the University of the Basque Country with a degree in Mathematics. She obtained a master's degree in Probability and Statistics from the Courant Institute of Mathematical Sciences (New York University) and a PhD in Economics from the University of the Basque Country. Since 2005, she has held a full professorship in Applied Economics. On 25 January 2021, she was named Rector of the University of the Basque Country (UPV/EHU).

Academic researcher 
In 1994, she received her PhD in Economics from the University of the Basque Country under the supervision of Dr. Fernando Tusell. The title of her doctoral thesis was "Non-parametric smoothing; with application to spectral estimation." In it, she formulated an estimation of the spectral density function, a fundamental function in the analysis of time series, always from a non-parametric point of view. Thus, her work studies and generalises non-parametric methods, in particular spline estimators, for general regression models; and on the other hand, it solved the problem of their application to spectral analysis, obtaining improved results. She also carried out research on computation and simulation, and with these tools, she demonstrated the theoretical results obtained during her thesis work. Her work has had applications in fields such as the analysis of the effects of drugs in medicine or the assessment of systemic risk in finance.

Subsequently, she was head of the PhD Programme in Quantitative Finance (UPV/EHU, 2000-2004 and 2013–2015).

In 2021, her research topics at the theoretical level were stochastic processes and non-parametric estimation; while at the application level, Ferreira's research topics were finance, the gender gap and the glass ceiling effect.

In several talks, she has explained how mathematics is also a useful tool in the analysis of inequalities between ethnic groups, between sexes, and between countries. The phenomenon of inequality has been studied from different disciplines, such as sociology, psychology, economics and political science. But, in addition, it can also be studied through mathematics; mathematical models can be applied to the social sciences. This means simplifying reality, but it helps to formulate hypotheses and to build statistical tools to test them. Ferreira has researched how mathematics can contribute to understanding the causes and evolution of inequalities by revealing, for example, how the 'glass ceiling' effect works.

Since March 2020, she has been a member of the expert committee of CEMAT (Spanish Mathematics Committee), where she has collaborated in the coronavirus data modelling and monitoring.

She has spent time as a guest researcher at various universities, including the University of Bath, University of Giessen, (Universidad Complutense de Madrid), University of Freiburg and University of Louisiana System, and has lectured at University of São Paulo, Louisiana and Ahmedabad University in India. She has also supervised five doctoral theses.

University management 
Eva has a long track record in university management, holding various positions, including the Vice-Rector for Economic Affairs and Academic Programs (2004-2008), General Secretary (2009-2012), and the Chief Director of Unibasq, the agency for the quality of the Basque University System. On 25 January 2021, she was named Rector of the University of the Basque Country (UPV/EHU), replacing Nekane Balluerka.

References 

Rectors of universities in Spain
Women heads of universities and colleges
Academic staff of the University of the Basque Country
Living people
1963 births
People from Barakaldo
University of the Basque Country alumni
Courant Institute of Mathematical Sciences alumni